Tritonia exsulans is a species of dendronotid nudibranch. It is a marine gastropod mollusc in the family Tritoniidae.

Distribution
This species is found in the NE Pacific in shallow water, to 100 m depth. It has been frequently confused with Tritonia tetraquetra and Tritonia diomedea.

References

Tritoniidae
Gastropods described in 1894